The Virginia Cavaliers softball team represents University of Virginia in NCAA Division I college softball.  The team participates in the Atlantic Coast Conference. The Cavaliers are currently led by head coach Joanna Hardin. The team plays its home games at Palmer Park located on the university's campus.

History

Coaching history

Championships

Conference Tournament Championships

Coaching staff

Awards and honors

Retired numbers
Sources:

Conference Awards and Honors
Sources:

ACC Player of the Year
Eileen Schmidt, 1993
Kristen Dennis, 2002
Sara Larquier, 2005

ACC Freshman of the Year
Kristen Dennis, 1999
Ruby Rojas, 2000

References

 
Atlantic Coast Conference softball
Sports clubs established in 1980
1980 establishments in Virginia